The Gerald D. Hines College of Architecture was founded in 1956 and is one of twelve academic colleges of the University of Houston. It offers both undergraduate and graduate level degree programs. In March 1997, Gerald D. Hines donated $7 million to the College of Architecture and the school responded by renaming the architecture school after him. The gift was the largest ever received by the architecture school and among the 10 largest gifts received by the University of Houston.

SICSA
Historically, The Sasakawa International Center for Space Architecture (SICSA) is housed within the Hines College of Architecture building, it was recently moved to the Cullen college of engineering but the student and faculty spaces are still located on the third floor of the building.

References

External links
 

Architecture
Architecture schools in Texas
Philip Johnson buildings